Wukesong Station is a station on Line 1 of the Beijing Subway.  Its northeast exit (B1) exits into the Huaxi Live entertainment complex.

Station Layout 
The station has an underground island platform.

Exits 
The station has eight exits, lettered A1, A2, B1, B2, C1, C2, D1, D2. Exit D1 is accessible.

Gallery

References

Beijing Subway stations in Haidian District
Railway stations in China opened in 1971